Victoria County (2016 population 18,617) is located in northwestern New Brunswick, Canada. Farming, especially of potatoes, is the major industry in the county.

Census subdivisions

Communities
There are five municipalities within Victoria County (listed by 2016 population):

First Nations
There is one First Nations reserve in Victoria County (listed by 2016 population):

Parishes
The county is subdivided into seven parishes (listed by 2016 population):

Demographics

Language

Ethnic Groups (2016)

Religious make-up (2001)

Transportation

Major highways

Protected areas and attractions

Notable people
Although not everyone in this list was born in Victoria County, they all live or have lived in Victoria County and have had significant connections to the communities.

See also
List of communities in New Brunswick

References

External links
Victoria County Guide

 
Counties of New Brunswick